The Voras Mountain Range or Nidzhe-Kozhuf are a mountain range in the Balkan Peninsula that lies on the border between North Macedonia and Greece.

Sub-ranges
The mountain range is typically divided in three mountain sub-ranges:
 Voras or Nidzhe.
 Kozhuf or Tzena.
 Paiko or Payak.

Geography
The mountains form a natural barrier between the Mediterranean and sub-continental climate in the region. The southern slopes drop down rapidly and encircle the Meglen field while the northern slopes gradually fall down towards the rivers Crna and Boshavica.

The mountain range hosts a ski resort at Kozhuf and the hot springs at Loutra Loutrakiou

External links
  Greek Mountain Flora

Mountain ranges of Greece
Mountain ranges of North Macedonia
Geography of Southeastern Europe
Greece–North Macedonia border
Landforms of Pella (regional unit)
Landforms of Central Macedonia